RFA Green Rover (A268) was a  fleet support tanker of the Royal Fleet Auxiliary, built by Swan Hunter Shipbuilders on the River Tyne, UK and completed in 1969. After decommissioning in 1992 she was sold to the Indonesian Navy and renamed 'KRI Arun (903)

Design and construction
The  were single-hulled tankers, designed to carry a mixture of fuel oil, aviation fuel, lubricating oil and fresh water supply for services around the globe; they could also carry limited dried stores of 340 tonnes such as munitions and refrigerated goods. They were built with a flight deck large enough to accommodate two helicopters, although no hangar was fitted. Although not big enough to support a large task group, these ships were ideal for supporting individual warships or small groups on deployment.

The keel of Green Rover was laid at Swan Hunter Shipbuilders Ltd's Hebburn yard on the River Tyne, UK on 28 February 1968, she was launched on 19 December the same year, and completed on 15 August 1969. She was in service with the Royal Fleet Auxiliary from 1969 until 1992.

Royal Fleet Auxiliary service
One of Green Rovers first duties was to attend Navy Days at Chatham. In September 1969 she towed the disabled  from the North Atlantic to Devonport. In September 1971 she carried out deck landing trials with the new Harrier jump jet while moored at Greenwich Pier on the Thames. Green Rover was decommissioned in 1992 from the Royal Fleet Auxiliary.

Indonesian Navy service
In April 1992 the ship was purchased by her builders who then resold her to the Indonesian Navy for £6 million. She was towed from Portsmouth to the Tyne renamed C to be taken in hand for a four-month refurbishment before re-entering service for her new owners. Commissioned as KRI Arun (903), in addition to providing tanker duties, she also became the flagship of the Training Command in the Indonesian fleet. She is still in service as of 2018.

On 19 March 2018 Arun'' took on a severe list during a replenishment operation off Ujung, Surabaya. The exercise was cancelled and she was towed to naval facilities at Surabaya for technical examination.

References

Tankers of the Royal Fleet Auxiliary
Rover-class tankers
1968 ships
Auxiliary ships of the Indonesian Navy